Flo or FLO may refer to:

People
Flo (name), a list of people with the name Flo
 Flo, nickname of LB1, a Homo floresiensis fossil

Places 
 Flo, Norway, a village near Stryn, Vestland
 Flo, Sweden, a historic parish near Grästorp, Västergötland
 Flo, Texas, an unincorporated community in Leon County, Texas, United States

Arts and entertainment

Film and television 
 Flo (TV series), an American TV sitcom
 FLO TV, an American mobile television service

Fictional characters 
 Flo (Progressive Insurance), in commercials for the American insurance company Progressive
 Florence Jean Castleberry, or Flo, first introduced in the 1974 film Alice Doesn't Live Here Anymore
 Flo, title character of the comic strip Flo & Friends
 Flo, a humbug damselfish from the Finding Nemo franchise
 Flo (Cars), a character from the Cars franchise

Music 
 Flo (group), a British girl group
 "Flo", a 2000 song by Smash Mouth from the album Fush Yu Mang

Other uses 
 Flo (chimpanzee), a member of the Kasakela chimpanzee community
 Flo (app), a menstruation, ovulation and pregnancy monitoring mobile application

Acronyms and codes
 Florence Regional Airport (IATA code FLO), South Carolina, U.S.
 Florence station (South Carolina), U.S.; station code FLO
 Fairtrade International, or Fairtrade Labelling Organizations International e.V. (FLO)
 Flowers Foods (New York Stock Exchange symbol FLO)
 Family Liaison Officer, a role in the British police

See also 

 Flo & Eddie, a musical pop duo
 
 
 Florian (disambiguation)
 Florence (disambiguation)
 Flow (disambiguation)
 Flou (disambiguation)
 Floh (disambiguation)
 Floe (disambiguation)